Ab-o-Atash Park (Pārk-e Āb-o-Ātaš), literally the "Water-and-Fire Park", also known as the Ebrahim Park (Pārk-e Ebrāhim), is a park in northern Tehran, Iran.

Features
There is also an amphitheater in the park, with a  tent which has a capacity of 370 people. Other features of the park include horse training, a light house, gazebos, and several interior cafeterias.

Ab-o-Atash Park is connected to Nowruz Park by the suspension bridge of Abrisham, and to Taleqani Forest Park by the largest pedestrian overpass of Tehran, Tabiat Bridge. It is also attached to Banader Park, with a light house in between.

Events

Water fight
On July 29, 2011, a water fight event was held by a large group of youth at the park, and received media attention. The event was organized on Facebook, and was held by water guns. It ended with the controversial temporary arrest of 10 participants, who the police announced to have done "unacceptable behavior."

Gallery

References

Parks in Tehran
Parks in Iran